"Men – Tyva men" is the regional anthem of the Republic of Tuva, a federal subject of Russia. It was composed by Kantomur Saryglar (also called Olonbayar Gantomir), and the lyrics were written by Okey Shanagash (also known as Bayantsagaan Oohiy). It was adopted officially by the Great Khural on 11 August 2011, replacing the previous anthem "Tooruktug Dolgay Tangdym".

Lyrics

Notes

References

External links
 Vocal version.

Russian anthems
Regional songs
Anthems of Tuva
National anthem compositions in D minor